The Srimpi (also written as Serimpi) is a ritualised dance of Java, Indonesia, associated with the royal palaces of Yogyakarta and Surakarta. The srimpi dance is one of the classical dances of Central Java. Along with the bedhaya, srimpi epitomised the elegant character of the royal Javanese court, becoming a symbol of the ruler's power as well as the refinement of Javanese culture.

Form and movement
The srimpi dance is usually performed by four female dancers, however other numbers such as two, six or eight dancers is also possible, depending on the type of srimpi being performed. Similarity in looks, height and body type among dancers is preferred to achieve better aesthetics. Srimpi demonstrate soft, slow and graceful movements, highly stylised hand positions, stances and body poses, coupled with the shoulder-baring kemben outfit, to describe elegance, modesty, refinement, beauty and grace. The dancer moves slowly accompanied with serene gamelan music.

The srimpi dances, being less sacred in nature than bedhaya, are much better known and often performed, not only in the two Keratons, but also outside the courts for ceremonies and festivals of common Javanese people. Up until today, the srimpi dances are still a part of court ceremonies, as princesses routinely rehearse various types of srimpi in the pendopo pavilion within the palace.

Gallery

See also

 Bedhaya
 Javanese dance
 Javanese culture
 Baksa kembang
 Kejawèn

Notes

References

 Revaluing Javanese Court Dances (Srimpi and Bedhaya) within the Current Social and Cultural Context by Michi Tomioka

Further reading
 Clara Brakel-Papenhuijzen. Classical Javanese Dance: The Surakarta Tradition and Its Terminology. KITLV Press, Leiden, Netherlands, 1995.

External links

 Video of Serimpi dance in Kraton Yogyakarta on YouTube
 Video of Serimpi Ludira Madu dance in Kraton Surakarta on YouTube

Dances of Java
Javanese culture